The  is a cabover van and pickup truck produced by the Japanese automaker Nissan from 1978 until 2011. The first two generations were engineered by Nissan's Aichi Manufacturing Division for private, personal ownership, with the last two generations built by Mazda, rebadged as Nissans and refocused as commercial vehicles, based on the Mazda Bongo. The van has also been sold as the Nissan Sunny-Vanette or Nissan Van. The private purchase passenger platform was replaced by the Nissan Serena in 1991, renamed Vanette in various international markets, and came equipped with multiple engine and drivetrain configurations.

2WD and 4WD versions were produced, with manual, automatic, floor and column shift options available. While no longer produced for the Japanese market, it was still available in other markets around the world such as Malaysia. Production ended around 2010, eventually being replaced by the Nissan NV200.

History
The first appearance of a cabover truck/delivery van appeared in 1962 with the Datsun Cablight, a rebadged version of the earlier Kurogane Mighty Nissan acquired when they assumed the operations of Tokyu Kogyo Kurogane. As the Cablight was reengineered, it was offered as a cab-over truck and van called the Datsun Sunny Cab/Nissan Cherry Cab (C20) introduced in 1969, and was one size smaller from the Prince Homer truck and the Prince Homy van. The cabover approach allowed the exterior dimensions to remain unchanged while increasing the length of the cargo area of the Nissan Sunny truck. The Sunny Cab Van/Cherry Cab Van passenger van could accommodate five passengers and an extended length coach that could carry eight people. Both Cab Vans didn't have sliding passenger doors, instead they had conventional front-hinged doors with extended lengths on the passenger side. The rear tailgate was a clamshell design where the door separated into two pieces that would extend up, with a tailgate on the lower half of the door.

The commercial model was basic, that kept the price low. The Sunny Truck continued to be built after the introduction of the second generation passenger version, and was only replaced in early 1971 by the new B120-series truck. The Cabover trucks were renamed the Nissan Vanette and the Nissan Cherry Cab/Vanette or Vonnate.

First generation (C120; 1978–1988)

Introduced in October 1978 as a replacement for the 1969 Nissan Cherry Cab/Sunny Cab C20 and Nissan Sunny Cab Van/Nissan Cherry Cab Van, the first Vanette was exported as the Datsun C20 (later the Nissan C20) or as the Nissan Datsun Vanette (later the Nissan Vanette). In the home market it was initially marketed as either the 'Nissan Sunny Vanette' or the 'Nissan Cherry Vanette', depending on the distribution network, although in engineering terms it borrowed heavily from the rear-wheel drive generations of the Sunny line—in particular the B210 and B310 series models, with which it shared engines and transmissions. The Sunny Vanette was sold through Nissan Satio Store and the Cherry Vanette was sold through Nissan Cherry Store locations. These two models had somewhat differing front-end treatment. In March 1980, a Datsun Vanette version was also added, sold through the Nissan Bluebird Store dealer network. The Datsun Vanette received twin headlights, while its related models had single headlights. It was a junior model to the larger Nissan Caravan.

Initially it was available in three lines: a truck version, vans (usually with passenger accommodation), and as a 9-seat minibus (Vanette Coach). The Coach received a  A14 four cylinder, producing  at 5,400 rpm. Later, the 1400 engine became available in Van and Truck versions as well. In July 1979, a high-roof version was added, as well as a long wheelbase van and ten-seater Coach version. This was stretched by 33 cm between the front and side doors, LWB versions were never available with the A12 engine. Some versions received separate air conditioning outlets for the rear.

In June 1980, the Coach version changed from the A14 to the larger (1,487 cc) A15 engine, offering . There was also a luxurious SGL version of the Vanette Coach added, with an available sunroof and swivelling captain's chairs in the rear – both firsts for the segment in Japan. To indicate its luxurious nature, the SGL received double square headlights for a more modern appearance. In June 1981 the LD20 diesel engine was added, as was a 2-litre gasoline version (Z20) for the top-of-the-line SGX version.

In 1981, Nissan introduced a smaller passenger vehicle which had sliding passenger doors on both sides of the vehicle, with conventional front doors, called the Nissan Prairie, making the Vanette/Largo no longer the smallest cargo van offered.

In October 1982, minor changes occurred (along with the introduction of the bigger "Largo"). The dashboard was redesigned, while the base 'CT' model received front disc brakes, the optional air conditioning system was modernized, and an inexpensive 'FL' Coach version was added. In October 1983 a DX-A version was added, followed by modifications to the transmission carried out in August 1985. The next month, production of Van and Coach models ended as they were replaced by the C22 Vanette. The truck versions of the C120 Vanette remained in production (with light modifications carried out in August 1986) until September 1988.

Vanette Largo 
The Vanette Largo (GC120) was introduced in October 1982 and was a wider (by 90 mm, to stay just beneath the important Japanese 1,700 mm tax threshold) and somewhat longer version. This was then developed into a cargo version built in Spain (by Nissan Ibérica), called the Nissan/Datsun Vanette Cargo. This largely supplanted the smaller Vanette versions in European markets. Engines were the A15 and Z20 gasoline versions, accompanied by the diesel LD20 (also available turbocharged). The Spanish-built versions were originally intended to be built with a Spanish-made Perkins diesel motor but this did not materialize. There was a minibus 'Coach' version of the Largo as well, with a luxurious "Grand Saloon" version topping the range.

The Vanette Largo continued in production until a GC22 successor arrived, in May 1986. From this point the Vanette name was dropped and the Largo became a separate, more luxurious model in its own right. In the Japanese market, the C120 vehicle was either marketed as the Datsun Vanette Largo or as a Nissan with the Cherry and Sunny prefixes. The Spanish C220 received a facelift and continued to be built into the 1990s, and was mostly sold in markets which hindered the import of Japanese-built vehicles.

Second generation (C22; 1985–1994)

Japan 
5 trim levels, 4 engine options and 2 transmission options were available for the C22 Vanette COACH series launched in Japan.
 
SC - 5/6 seater, available in 1.5L A15 (67ps) petrol engine and 2L LD20.II (67ps) diesel engine. Manual only transmission. Distinguished by round headlamps and no rear screen wiper.

GL - 8/9 seater, available in 1.5L engine and 2L diesel. Manual only transmission. Square headlamps.

SGL- 8/9 seater, available in 1.5L and 2L diesel engine. Automatic transmission optional. Rectangle headlamps with high roof. All SGL variants has collapsible seats, rotatable middle row seat and rear air conditioning. Longer body length of 4050mm vs the SC and GL at 3980mm 

SGL Panorama Roof - Similar to SGL except with the optional glass sunroof that stretches from driver seat row to 2nd row seats. 

SGL EXCEL - 8 seater, available in 2L petrol Z20S or 2L diesel LD20.II engine. Later models came with CA20 petrol engine. Automatic transmission optional. Top of the range model which comes with color coded bumpers, chrome trimming, central locking, panorama glass roof, factory fitted audio and cooler box mounted in the center console.
 
A late model update with enlarged version similar to the US market Nissan Van was again sold in Japan as the Largo, until 1992 when the Serena-based Nissan Largo was launched.

United States 
The Nissan C22 was modified for the United States market to compete with the similar sized Toyota Van and Mitsubishi Van, and to join the growing minivan market in the US. This van was sold as the "Nissan Van" in the US from 1986–1989, where it was billed as a cheaper alternative to Chrysler's minivans. Most of the vans were sold in the Sun Belt states, particularly California, Texas, and Florida, and sales were strongest for the first two years. Nissan had to engineer its larger 2.4-liter Z24i engine into the C22 to handle American market requirements which included air conditioning and highway driving. The C22 was not originally designed for such a large engine, and the resulting tight quarters would later contribute to overheating and engine fire issues.

In 1994, after four safety recalls did not end the engine fire problems, and with a class action lawsuit pending, Nissan took the unprecedented step of recalling every Nissan Van sold in the US. Van owners were offered Kelly Blue Book value or more for their van, and most accepted, but a few opted to keep their vans. Critics argued that Nissan had been long aware of the problems with the vans (the first reports of fires appeared in 1987, shortly after they went on sale in the US), but did not take action for years, after which they had been replaced by the Nissan Quest. By the time of the recall in 1994, at least 135 fires had been reported, although none of them had resulted in deaths or injuries. The class-action settlement offered discounts on the purchase of a new Nissan vehicle.  The vehicles which were recalled were crushed en masse.

The Nissan Van was intended mainly as a stopgap for the North American market until a proper minivan could be introduced, and it was replaced by the Nissan Quest in 1993, a vehicle designed in a joint venture with Ford.

Malaysia

The C22 Nissan Vanette was built in Malaysia at the Tan Chong assembly plant in Segambut (Kuala Lumpur) until 2010. After 13 years in production, it was the longest running model built in Malaysia. There was a chassis cab, a truck, a panel van, and a window van version. While it has had a few facelifts over the years, the basic body was still the same. The 1980s interior is still intact. Malaysia was the only place where the Vanette was built for many years, being exported from there to many other markets. After a brief hiatus, it was replaced by the Nissan NV200, which retains the "Vanette" name in the Malaysian market.

Philippines 
The Nissan Vanette was available in the Philippines until the end of 1999 as the Nissan Vanette Grand coach. In its final version it remains essentially the same Vanette as in previous years except for a different wheel design, upgraded seat materials and a faux wood trim dashboard. The sole engine available is the Z20 2.0-liter gasoline engine. Unlike in other Asian countries, no diesel variant was offered or available, which was an oversight on Nissan's part that could have made the difference in the van's popularity.

India 
The C22 Vanette also provides the basis for Ashok Leyland's "Dost", the Indian truck manufacturer's first entry into this market segment.

Gallery

Third generation (S20, SE, SK; 1994–1999)

A badge engineered Mazda Bongo, also rebadged as Ford Econovan and Ford Spectron.

Fourth generation (S21, SK; 1999–2011)

A badge engineered Mazda Bongo/Ford Econovan. The successor of the Vanette van is the Nissan NV200 Vanette.

References

Vanette
Cab over vehicles
Vans
Minibuses
Pickup trucks
Cars introduced in 1978